The Rich, the Pauper and the Butler is a 2014 comedy film directed by Aldo, Giovanni & Giacomo and Morgan Bertacca.

Cast
Aldo Baglio as Aldo
Giovanni Storti as Giovanni
Giacomo Poretti as Giacomo
Giuliana Lojodice as Calcedonia Randone
Francesca Neri as Assia
Sara D'Amario as Camilla
Massimo Popolizio as Father Amerigo
Rosalia Porcaro as Samantha
Guadalupe Lancho as Dolores
Giovanni Esposito as policeman at the airport
Chiara Sani as Luana

References

External links
 

2014 comedy films
Italian comedy films
2010s Italian-language films
2010s Italian films